The 2019–20 Cypriot Cup was the 78th edition of the Cypriot Cup. A total of 24 clubs were accepted to enter the competition. It begins on 30 October 2019 with the first round and will conclude in May 2020 with the final held at GSP Stadium. The winner of the Cup will qualify for the 2020–21 Europa League second qualifying round.

On 15 May 2020, the cup was abandoned due to COVID-19 pandemic.

First round
The first round draw took place on 30 October 2019 and the matches were played on 30 October 2019.

Second round
The second round draw took place on 20 December 2019.

The following eight teams advanced directly to second round and will meet the eight winners of the first round ties:
AEL Limassol (2018–19 Cypriot Cup winner)
APOEL (2018–19 Cypriot Cup runners-up)
Apollon Limassol (via draw)
Doxa Katokopias (via draw)
Enosis Neon Paralimni (via draw)
Ethnikos Achna (via draw)
Olympiakos Nicosia (via draw)
Pafos FC (via draw)

    

          
            
             
             
            
|}

First leg

Second leg

Quarter-finals
 
      
  
              

|}

Semi-finals
All matches cancelled.

 
  
  
|}

Final
Cancelled.

See also	
 2019–20 Cypriot First Division	
 2019–20 Cypriot Second Division

References

	

Cup
Cyprus
Cypriot Cup seasons
Cypriot Cup